Choapa Province is one of the provinces making up the Coquimbo Region of Chile. It has an area of 10,079.8 km² and a population of 81,681. The capital of the province is the town of Illapel.

Administration
The current presidential provincial delegate is Nataly Carvajal.

Communes
The province is divided into four communes (comunas) administered by four municipalities:
Illapel
Salamanca
Los Vilos
Canela

Geography and demography
Between the 1992 and 2002 censuses, the population grew by 4.6% (3,603 persons).

Choapa Valley wine region
The Choapa Valley is located 400 km (250 mi) north of Santiago, in the southern part of the Region of Coquimbo, and is named after the province of “Choapa”.

This area is within the narrowest part of Chile, where the Andes meet the Coastal range. The small valley consists of two sectors, Illapel and Salamanca. There are no wineries in any of these sectors, but vines planted on the rocky, foothill soils produce small quantities of high quality Syrah and Cabernet Sauvignon grapes with high acidity and low pH, which is increasing the interest for the area among many wine producers.
Only one brand of wine, De Martino Syrah, currently holds the D.O. of “Choapa Valley”.

Grape distribution by varietal

 Climate:  Desert-like climate. 100 mm (4.5 in) of rain per year. High luminosity.
 Soils: clay, silt, and chalk.
 Primary grape varietals: Cabernet Sauvignon and Syrah.
 
 

 
 Total Hectares planted: 96 ha (237 acres)

See also

 Chilean wine
 Coquimbo

References

 

Provinces of Chile
Provinces of Coquimbo Region